Heimdal is a borough in the city of Trondheim, Trøndelag county, Norway.

Heimdal or Heimdall may refer to:

Places

Norway
 Heimdal Station, a railway station in Trondheim
 Heimdal Church, a parish church in Trondheim
 Heimdal Upper Secondary School, Sør-Trøndelag county
 Heimdal, Innlandet, a village, Løten municipality, Innlandet county
 Heimdal gas field, in the North Sea

Elsewhere
 Heimdal (crater), an impact crater on Mars
 Heimdal, North Dakota, a census-designated place and unincorporated community in Wells County, US
 Heimdal Glacier, Greenland

Other uses
 HNoMS Heimdal (1892), a Norwegian warship

 Heimdall, a god in Norse mythology
 Heimdall (character), a character from Marvel Comics
 Heimdal, an implementation of the Kerberos authentication protocol
 2015 Heimdal train derailment, near Heimdal, North Dakota, US
 Boldklubben Heimdal, a football club in Copenhagen, Denmark
 Heimdal (album), a 2023 album by Enslaved

See also 
Heimdall (disambiguation)